Jason Duda (born May 5, 1975) is a Canadian retired professional ice hockey player who played for the Wichita Thunder of the Central Hockey League (CHL). He then served as assistant coach for the Wichita Thunder until being dismissed from that job on October 2, 2015.

Early life
Duda was born in Sexsmith, Alberta.

Awards
 Thunder Most Improved Player – 1996-97
 CHL All-Star Team – 2001, 2005, 2006
 2005 Greater Wichita Area Sports Commission Pro Athlete of the Year 
 Joe Burton Award (Scoring Champion) – 2004-05
 Rick Kozuback Award – 2010
 CHL Oakley Player of the Week: Week Ending – January 3, 2005; March 5, 2007; November 2, 2008
 His number 11 was retired by the Wichita Thunder on October 16, 2010.
 Named to CHL All-Decade Second Team on December 31, 2009.

Records

Melfort Mustangs
 Most points in a single season (1995–96) - 141 points 
 Most goals scored in a single season (1995–96) - 60 goals
 Most power play goals in a single season (1995–96) - 27 power play goals
 Most assists in a single season (1995–96) - 81 assists

Wichita Thunder
 Most career games played - (730)
 Most career goals scored - (337)
 Most career assists - (553)
 Most career points - (870)
 Most hat tricks - (11)
 Most overtime goals - (7)
 Most shootout goals - (21)
 Most consecutive games from 2001-2003 - (225)

Central Hockey League
 Third in career goals - (339)
 Third in career assists - (539)
 Third in career points - (878)
 Second in career games played - (745)

Career statistics

Personal life
Duda resides in Wichita with his wife Deah and their two children. Duda also was a co-host for KAKE Sports Overtime Live.

References

External links
 

Living people
1975 births
Canadian expatriate ice hockey players in the United States
Canadian ice hockey forwards
Ice hockey people from Alberta
Medicine Hat Tigers players
Oklahoma City Blazers (1992–2009) players
Saskatoon Blades players
Wichita Thunder coaches
Wichita Thunder players